The Peavine Ranch, at 11220 N. Virginia St. in Reno, Nevada, is a historic  property with significance dating to 1862.  It was listed on the National Register of Historic Places in 2000;  the listing included five contributing buildings.
It was once a stagecoach stop, but became a ghost town after a fire in 1900.

References 

National Register of Historic Places in Reno, Nevada
Houses completed in 1862
Buildings and structures in Washoe County, Nevada
Ranches on the National Register of Historic Places in Nevada
Ghost towns in Washoe County, Nevada
1862 establishments in Nevada Territory